R. Sundaramoorthy is an Indian make-up artist and actor known for his work in Hindi and Tamil films. He is best known for his work in the film Padayappa (1999). Sundaramoorthy is notably the first make-up artist for Rajinikanth.

Career 
Sundaramoorthy began his career as an assistant to his father, A. V. Ramachandran Mudaliar s/o A.Venugopal Mudaliar (Chennai) . He worked as a make-up artist for several artists including Kamal Haasan, Rajinikanth, Saritha, Thiagarajan, Murali, and J. P. Chandrababu. Sundaramoorthy has worked with Rajinikanth since the beginning of the latter's career starting with Apoorva Raagangal. He continued working with Rajinikanth for his 100th film Sri Raghavendrar and went on to win the Tamil Nadu State Film Award for Best Make-up Artist for his work in Padayappa. Sundaramoorthy continued working with Rajinikanth until Chandramukhi (2005).

Filmography

Make-up artist
Sadhu Mirandal (1966; assistant)
Madras to Pondicherry (1966; assistant) 
Thamarai Nenjam (1968)
Poova Thalaiya (1969)
Shanti Nilayam (1969)
Iru Kodugal (1969)
Velli Vizha (1972)
Apoorva Raagangal (1975)
Moondru Mudichu (1976)
Avargal (1977)
Ek Duuje Ke Liye (1981)
Sanam Teri Kasam (1982)
Sagara Sangamam (1983)
Ek Nai Paheli (1984)
Bombay (1995)
Dil Se.. (1998)
Padayappa (1999)
Chandramukhi (2005)

Actor
Films

Television

Awards and nominations

References

External links 
 

Indian make-up artists
 Actors in Tamil cinema
 Actors in Kannada cinema